Callicilix is a monotypic genus of moths belonging to the subfamily Drepaninae and contains the single species Callicilix abraxata.

The wingspan is about 44 mm. Adults are creamy-white, all wings with a marginal series of large oval grey-brown spots and some partly confluent irregular patches tending to form a submarginal band. The forewings are crossed by a broad and somewhat irregular central belt, which is grey-brown towards the costa and enclosing a spot of the ground colour, but dark golden brown below the subcostal vein, crossed by pearl-grey veins with black extremities and transversed internally by a pale sinuous line. There are three grey-brown spots across the basal area and there are two oval spots on the radial interspaces and a third pearl-white spot near the apex. The hindwings have a large grey-brown patch from the center of the abdominal margin to the middle of the wing, where it is continued by two spots to the costa. There is a small spot near the base of the interno-median area and four pearl-white spots on the disc between the submedian and radial veins.

Subspecies
Callicilix abraxata abraxata (Japan)
Callicilix abraxata nguldoe (Oberthür, 1893) China (Sichuan, Tibet, Guizhou, Hunan)

References

Drepaninae
Monotypic moth genera
Drepanidae genera